Lola (minor planet designation: 463 Lola) (1900 FS) is a Main-belt asteroid discovered on 31 October 1900 by Max Wolf at Heidelberg. It is named after Lola, a character from Pietro Mascagni's opera Cavalleria Rusticana.

References

External links 
 
 

000463
Discoveries by Max Wolf
Named minor planets
000463
000463
19001031